Neothiobinupharidine is a dimeric thiaspirane alkaloid isolated from the dwarf water lily Nuphar pumila.  It exhibits weak immunosuppressive and cytotoxic bioactivity in cell line experiments.

References

Alkaloids
Spiro compounds
Quinolizidines
Thiophenes
3-Furyl compounds